Sosebee Cove is a  high-elevation, north-facing, cove forest found in the Chattahoochee National Forest.  The trail through the cove is dedicated to Arthur Woody, who negotiated the Cove's purchase for the United States Forest Service.  Located near Blairsville, Georgia in the Blue Ridge Ranger District, Sosebee Cove has a rich diversity of shade tolerant trees, shrubs, and wildflowers.

External links 
Forest Service Sosebee Cove Website

Protected areas of Union County, Georgia
Chattahoochee-Oconee National Forest
Forests of Georgia (U.S. state)